James Dale Strawbridge (April 7, 1824 – July 19, 1890) was a Republican member of the U.S. House of Representatives from Pennsylvania.

Biography
James D. Strawbridge was born in Liberty Township, Pennsylvania.  He graduated from Princeton College in 1844 and from the medical department of the University of Pennsylvania at Philadelphia in 1847.  He was engaged in the practice of medicine at Danville, Pennsylvania.  During the American Civil War, Strawbridge entered the Union Army as a brigade surgeon of Volunteers and served throughout the war.  He resumed the practice of medicine at Danville.

Congress
Strawbridge was elected as a Republican to the Forty-third Congress.  After his time in Congress he returned to the practice of medicine.  He died in Danville in 1890.  Interment in Fairview Cemetery.

References
 Retrieved on 2008-02-14
The Political Graveyard

1824 births
1890 deaths
19th-century American politicians
Princeton University alumni
Perelman School of Medicine at the University of Pennsylvania alumni
People of Pennsylvania in the American Civil War
Republican Party members of the United States House of Representatives from Pennsylvania
Union Army surgeons